Speedwell is a rural locality in the South Burnett Region, Queensland, Australia.

History 
Speedwell Provisional School operated from 12 August 1912 to July 1913 as a half-time provisional school with Abbeywood Provisional School (meaning they shared a single teacher between them). It then became a full-time provisional school (having its own teacher). On 1 January 1915, it became Speedwell State School. It closed in 1962. It was at the kink in Speedwell School Road.

Speedwell Baptist Church opened on Sunday 16 April 1916. In 1967, the church building and congregation relocated to Proston.

References

Further reading 

 —includes the schools at Abbeywood, Brigooda, Hivesville, Kinleymore, Speedwell.

South Burnett Region
Localities in Queensland